Norsk Jernverk is a former Norwegian industrial company which was founded in 1946 in Mo i Rana, fully owned by the Norwegian government. The production started in 1955. In 1985 it acquired the steel company Christiania Spigerverk, which was later again sold out as a separate company. Norsk Jernverk was later renamed Norsk Jern Holding, which was made into a private company in the 1990s, and was later taken over by the Finnish company Rautaruukki.

References

Manufacturing companies of Norway
Companies based in Rana, Norway
Manufacturing companies established in 1946
1946 establishments in Norway